Coming Attractions is a 1957 anthology of science fiction essays edited by Martin Greenberg.  Many of the articles originally appeared in the magazines Thrilling Wonder Stories, Astounding, Science Fiction Stories and Fantasy and Science Fiction.

Contents
 Preface, by Martin Greenberg
 Introduction, by Dwight W. Batteau
 "A Letter to the Martians", by Willy Ley
 "How to Learn Martian", by Charles F. Hockett
 "Language for Time Travelers", by L. Sprague de Camp
 "Geography for Time Travelers", by Willy Ley
 "Time Travel and the Law", by C. M. Kornbluth
 "Space Fix", by R. S. Richardson
 "Space War", by Willy Ley
 "Space War Tactics", by Malcolm Jameson
 "Fuel for the Future", by Jack Hatche
 "How to Count on Your Fingers", by Frederik Pohl
 "Interplanetary Copyright", by Donald F. Reines

References

1957 anthologies
Essay anthologies
Science fiction anthologies
Gnome Press books